Alchemilla glabra is a species of plants belonging to the family Rosaceae.

It is native to Eurasia.

References

glabra